Jagz Nation Vol. 2: Royal Niger Company is the third studio album by Nigerian rapper and record producer Jesse Jagz. Released by Jagz Nation on March 28, 2014, the album marked a departure from the dancehall and ragga elements deployed on Jagz Nation, Vol.1. Thy Nation Come (2013). Jesse Jagz enlisted Shady, Dugod, Ibro and Phazehop to assist with production. The album consists of samples ranging from Rufus & Chaka Khan's "Ain't Nobody" to excerpts from movies such as Network (1976), Scarface (1983) and Johnny Mad Dog (2008). Jagz Nation Vol. 2: Royal Niger Company features guest appearances and recording samples from Fela Kuti, Tupac, Rufus & Chaka Khan, Tesh Carter, Jumar, Dugod, Sarah Mitaru, Rexx and Show Dem Camp.

Background and launch concert
Jesse Jagz started creating the album by recording a mixture of ideas for two months. After the two-month period, his team sifted through the music and selected the album's final track listing. He chose the album's title to sensitize people about their history and said he made the album for his core fans. He describes the album as two steps above Jagz Nation, Vol.1. Thy Nation Come and said he wanted to stay away from reggae influential sounds because of sentimental reasons. He hopes people find healing from the album and wants people who are hurting to find comfort in it. On March 17, 2014, the album's cover art was released to the general public. Inspired by René Magritte, it is symbolic of a man standing with a fruit and apple blocking his face. The concept behind Magritte's work revolves around revealing one thing and hiding another. The cover art features a model holding different things that symbolize the culture of Nigeria.

Jagz Nation Vol. 2: Royal Niger Company was initially meant to be a mixtape and was initially titled The Transfiguration of Jesse Jagz. On March 28, 2014, Jesse Jagz made the album available for digital streaming on SoundCloud. On August 2, 2014, he held the second edition of the Jesse Jagz Experience concert at the AGIP Recital Hall; he called it "The Greatest Concert" and performed alongside a 16-man hip-hop orchestra band.

Composition
Jagz Nation Vol. 2: Royal Niger Company is an all-out rap album that doesn't favor any mainstream commercial appeal. On the Joe Louis-inspired album's opener "Louis", Jesse Jagz raps about one finding their inner strength; the song is a mixture of rap and Rastafarian styles. In "Jargo (Ain't Nobody)", he samples Rufus & Chaka Khan's "Ain't Nobody" and raps about the dynamics of a complex relationship. "Sunshine" contains a popular riff from Fela Kuti and incorporates "Loopy Bars", a J-Town style of rap. In "The Search (Radio)", he blends hip hop and jazz sounds together. "Supply and Demand" is a throwback song with a New York pounding flow that is reminiscent of 1995 and the East Coast circa. In "Sunrise (Shine On)", he samples a dialogue from the 1983 crime drama film Scarface. In "How We Do", a song with a menacing beat, Jesse Jagz samples spoken words from Tupac.

Singles and other releases
The album's lead single "The Search (Radio)" was released on May 15, 2015. It features rap verses from Jumar and Dugod. The accompanying music video for the song was directed by J.O King. In March 2015, Jesse Jagz released the Terver Trump-directed visuals for "Sunshine".

Critical reception

Jagz Nation Vol. 2: Royal Niger Company received positive reviews from music critics. Ayomide Tayo of Nigerian Entertainment Today awarded the album 4 stars out of 5, saying it was made for rap fans to "chill and relax to" and acknowledged it for not seeking the approval of radio or Alaba. Wilfred Okiche said the album stands out for its cohesiveness and opined that it "deserves to be saved in a time capsule, to be brought up years later when someone tries to suggest great records weren’t made in 2014". Okiche also called it "ambitious, daring, cerebral and painfully beautiful". Brandon Bridges of Lobatan gave the album 4 stars out of 5, saying it "plays by no rules and subjects to no compromise" while also noting its themes are not "a newly applied road of thought". Dennis Peter of Filter Free Nigeria praised the album's production and Jesse Jagz's rhymes and metaphors. Peters also considers the album to be Jesse Jagz's best album yet.

Track listing

Samples
"Louis" samples a rant from Howard Beale, a fictional character from the movie Network
"Jargo (Ain't Nobody)" samples "Ain't Nobody", performed by Rufus and Chaka Khan; it also samples excerpts from the film Johnny Mad Dog (2008) 
"Sunshine" samples spoken words by Fela Kuti
"How We Do" samples spoken words by Tupac Shakur
"Sunrise (Shine On)" samples a dialogue from the film Scarface (1983)

Personnel

Jesse Garba Abaga – executive producer, writer, composer
Shadrach "Shady Bizniz" Ishaya – producer
Chidozie "Dugod" Ezeogu – producer, featured artist
Tesh Carter – featured artist
Sarah Mitaru – featured artist
Jumar – featured artist
Rex – featured artist
Show Dem Camp – featured artists
Ibrahim "Ibro" Pashi – producer, mixing, mastering
Bolaji "Phazehop" Williams – producer, mixing, mastering
J Barz – producer
Wilfred Crackaz Peter Bass Guitar – live instruments
Progress Hopeman Guitarist – live instruments
Adu Edu Bassey – live instruments
House of Zoe Africa – management, visual production, cover art
Ogbannaya "Signor Chuksy" Chukwudi – art director, graphic design, photography
iola Creative – styling
Damimola Alabi – cover art model

Release history

References

External links
Jagz Nation Vol. 2: Royal Niger Company at SoundCloud

2014 albums
Jesse Jagz albums
Albums produced by Jesse Jagz
Albums produced by Shady Bizniz